The 1997–98 Regionalliga was the fourth season of the Regionalliga as the third tier of German football. The league was organised in four regional divisions, Nord, Nordost, West-Südwest and Süd.

Hannover 96, Tennis Borussia Berlin, Rot-Weiß Oberhausen and SSV Ulm 1846 were promoted to the 2. Bundesliga.

North

Final table

Top scorers

North-East

Final table

Top scorers

West/South-West

Final table

Top scorers

South

Final table 

NB KSV Hessen Kassel were declared bankrupt mid-season and all results were therefore annulled.

Top scorers

Promotion playoffs 
A preliminary decider was contested between the champions of the North and North-East regions. Hannover 96 won on penalties and so were promoted to the 2. Bundesliga.

The loser of the above tie faced the 2nd placed teams from the South and West/South-West regions for a final promotion place.

Tennis Borussia Berlin were promoted to the 2. Bundesliga.

Top goalscorer 
 Rainer Wiedemann (FSV Lok Altmark Stendal) – 25 goals

References

External links
 Regionalliga Nord 1997–98  at kicker.de
 Regionalliga Nordost 1997–98  at kicker.de
 Regionalliga West/Südwest 1997–98  at kicker.de
 Regionalliga Süd 1997–98  at kicker.de

1997-98
3
Germ